Jacques Vernier may refer to:

 Jacques Vernier (athlete) (1923–2015), French long-distance runner
 Jacques Vernier (politician) (born 1944), French politician